Vicious Games is a song by Swiss group Yello, released in 1985. It was released as the second single from Stella. Vicious Games appears on the band's compilation album Essential Yello.

Background 
Vicious Games was released on 27 February 1985, with a video shot in Yello's Rote Fabrik (Red Factory) working space, featuring Blank and actress Mirjam Montandon miming to Rush Winters' vocals (Winters was not available for the video shoot).

Track listing 
7" single

12" single

Charts

Re-releases 
"Vicious Games" has been re-released a number of times over the years, with different remixes. In 1993, with remixes by Mark Picchiotti, Teri Bristol and Maurice Joshua.  In 1998, a version released as by Yello vs. Hardfloor came with a plethora of remixes over three 12-inch vinyls, with an additional Art of Trance remix released in 1999. Six more remixes of the Yello vs. Hardfloor version was released in 2010.

1993
 Vicious Games (Yello Belly Trippin' Trance Mix) – 6:38
 Vicious Games (Vicious Radio Mix) – 4:34
 Vicious Games (Mo's Dirty Ol Dub #1) – 7:15
 Vicious Games (Vicious Vocal Club Mix) – 7:14

1995
Three remixes by The Grid were released on different formats of the Hands on Yello compilation.
 Vicious Games (12" Edit) – 4:44
 Vicious Games (Ambient Mix) – 4:34
 Vicious Games (Instrumental Acid) – 8:15

1998
 Vicious Games (Hardfloor Remix) – 7:05
 Vicious Games (Slow Vocal Mix) – 6:05
 Vicious Games (Hardfloor Dub Mix) – 5:48
 Vicious Games (Slow Dub Mix) – 5:21
 Vicious Games (Boris Blank & Olaf Wollschläger Remix) – 6:34
 Vicious Games (Vorsprung Durch Technik Remix) – 8:34
 Vicious Games (Da Bomb Mix) – 6:49
 Vicious Games (Blank & Jones Mix) – 6:39
 Vicious Games (Headroom Mix) – 6:53
 Vicious Games (Gorgeous Mix) – 5:20

1999
 Vicious Games (Art of Trance Remix) – 8:07

2010
 Vicious Games (Koen Groeneveld Remix) – 7:41
 Vicious Games (Manuel de la Mare Remix) – 6:47
 Vicious Games (Addy van der Zwan & R3hab Remix) – 6:37
 Vicious Games (Markus Gardeweg Remix) – 7:22
 Vicious Games (Frank Ellrich Remix) – 6:11
 Vicious Games (Lemon Popsicle Remix) – 6:57

References

External links 
 Yello – Vicious Games. List of releases on Discogs.
 Yello vs Hardfloor – Vicious Games. List of releases on Discogs.

Yello songs
1985 songs
1985 singles
Elektra Records singles
Vertigo Records singles
Polydor Records singles
Smash Records singles
Mercury Records singles
Songs written by Boris Blank (musician)
Songs written by Dieter Meier